Trichomycterus is a genus of fish in the family Trichomycteridae, the largest genus of its family with over 170 species currently described. This genus is native to freshwater habitats in Central and South America. Species differ from one another primarily in body proportions, fin ray counts and colouration. Despite their relatively small size, some, such as T. punctulatus, support fisheries and are important in the local cuisine.

Taxonomy
This genus is defined by the lack of specializations found in other trichomycterids and is certainly polyphyletic. Although known to contain many species, Trichomycterus is poorly known with many of the known species based on brief descriptions. Many species have been described recently and many more are waiting to be described.

Some authors have tentatively defined putative monophyletic assemblages within the genus Trichomycterus based on the possession of unique morphological features. The Trichomycterus brasiliensis species-complex includes T. brasiliensis, T. iheringi, T. maracaya, T. mimonha, T. pirabitira, T. potschi, T. vermiculatus and several undescribed species apparently endemic to the main river basins draining the Brazilian Shield. However, an assemblage of species from south and southeastern Brazil is also supported that includes T. araxa, T. castroi, T. davisi, T. guaraquessaba, T. immaculatus, T. itatiayae, T. mboycy, T. mirissumba, T. naipi, T. nigricans, T. papilliferus, T. plumbeus, T. stawiarski, T. taroba, T. triguttatus and T. zonatus, T. aguarague, T. alterus, T. belensis, T. boylei and T. ramosus also form a diagnosable species assemblage.

Distribution and habitat
Species of Trichomycterus inhabit a diversity of habitats throughout South and Central America from Costa Rica in the north to Patagonia in the south and from lowland Atlantic rainforest in the east to Andean highland streams in the west. They are, together with Astroblepus and Orestias, among the very few native fish genera at high altitude in the Andes and in some places, for example certain high-elevation localities in western Argentina, Trichomycterus are the only fishes. About 60 nominal species are endemic to the river basins draining the Andes and hills of the Guianan Shield and about 30 species are endemic to river basins draining the Brazilian Shield.

Despite the broad distribution of the genus, most species have limited distributions and usually are restricted to only one river. Wide-ranging species are most likely complexes of species that are difficult to differentiate, such as the T. brasiliensis species-complex. Trichomycterus gorgona, from a small stream on Gorgona Island located west of the Pacific coast of Colombia, is the first known trichomycterid to be endemic to an offshore island. Many species are troglobitic.

Species
There are currently 174 recognized species in this genus:

References

 
Catfish genera
Fish of Central America
Fish of South America
Freshwater fish genera
Taxa named by Achille Valenciennes
Trichomycteridae